Indrek Sammul (born 28 January 1972) is an Estonian actor. He has graduated Estonian Academy of Music's Higher Theatre School in 1994 (now, the Estonian Academy of Music and Theatre). Since then he has worked as an actor in Tallinn City Theatre and Ugala Theatre. His first television role was in 1995 when he played in a drama series Wikman Boys.

Personal life
Sammul was married to actress Katariina Unt from 1993 until they divorced in 1995. Since 1998, Sammul has been married to Estonian actress Liina Olmaru. The couple have three adopted children, two sons and a daughter.

Filmography
Films

Television

External links

1972 births
Living people
Estonian male stage actors
Estonian male film actors
Estonian male television actors
People from Viljandi
20th-century Estonian male actors
21st-century Estonian male actors
Estonian Academy of Music and Theatre alumni